Synarthonia leproidica is a species of saxicolous (rock-dwelling) and crustose lichen in the order Arthoniales. Found in Luxembourg, it was formally described as a new species in 2020 by lichenologists Damien Ertz, André Aptroot, and Paul Diederich. Here the lichen was found on a siliceous wall at the edge of a forest path in an oak-hornbeam forest. It has a pale greyish crust-like thallus with dark brown/violet tinges. It has a leproid growth form, meaning that it looks like it is made of granules; the specific epithet refers to this characteristic. Synarthonia leproidica contains psoromic acid, a secondary chemical that can be detected with thin-layer chromatography.

References

Arthoniomycetes
Lichen species
Lichens described in 2020
Lichens of Europe
Taxa named by André Aptroot